Johannes Bolte (11 February 1858 – 25 July 1937) was a German folklorist. A prolific writer, he wrote over 1,400 publications, including monographs, articles, notes and book reviews.

Works
 Zeugnisse zur Geschichte unserer Kinderspiele, Zeitschrift für Volkskunde 19 (1909), pp. 381-414
 (with Georg Polívka) Anmerkungen zu den Kinder- und Hausmärchen der Brüder Grimm, 5 vols, 1913-32

References

Further reading
 Fritz Boehm, 'Johannes Bolte: Sein Leben und sein volkskundliches Werk', Zeitschrift für Volkskunde 46 (1936-37), pp.1-15
 Walter Anderson, Johannes Bolte: Ein Nachruf, Helsinki: Academia Scientiarum Fennica, 1939. FF Communications 124.
 Fritz Boehm, 'Bolte-Bibliographie', Zeitschrift für Volkskunde 42 (1932) pp.1-68

1858 births
1937 deaths
German folklorists
Members of the Göttingen Academy of Sciences and Humanities